The 2015 Davis Cup World Group Play-offs were held from 18 to 20 September. The winners of the playoffs advanced to the 2016 Davis Cup World Group, and the losers were relegated to their respective Zonal Regions I.

Teams
Bold indicates team qualified for the 2016 Davis Cup World Group.

From World Group
 
 
 
 
 
 
 
 

 From Americas Group I

 
 

 From Asia/Oceania Group I

 
 

 From Europe/Africa Group I

Results summary
Date: 18–20 September

The eight losing teams in the World Group first round ties and eight winners of the Zonal Group I final round ties competed in the World Group Play-offs for spots in the 2016 World Group.  The draw took place on July 21 in London.

Seeded teams

 
 
 
 
 
 
 
 

Unseeded teams

 
 
 
 
 
 
 
 

 were promoted to the World Group in 2016.
 were relegated to Zonal Group I in 2016.

Playoff results

India vs. Czech Republic

Switzerland vs. Netherlands

Russia vs. Italy

Uzbekistan vs. United States

Colombia vs. Japan

Dominican Republic vs. Germany

Brazil vs. Croatia

Poland vs. Slovakia

References

World Group Play-offs